is a Japanese former football player.

Career
After three seasons playing for Fagiano Okayama in J2 League, Mukuhara retired in December 2020.

Career statistics

Club
Updated to end of 2018 season.

1Includes Emperor's Cup.

2Includes J. League Cup.

3Includes AFC Champions League.

4Includes Suruga Bank Championship and Japanese Super Cup.

Honours

Club
  F.C. Tokyo
J. League Division 2 (1) : 2011
Emperor's Cup (1) : 2011
J. League Cup (1) : 2009
Suruga Bank Championship (1) : 2010

References

External links

Profile at Cerezo Osaka

1989 births
Living people
Association football people from Tokyo
Japanese footballers
J1 League players
J2 League players
J3 League players
FC Tokyo players
Cerezo Osaka players
Cerezo Osaka U-23 players
Sanfrecce Hiroshima players
Fagiano Okayama players
Association football defenders